This article contains a list of topics related to the Cocos (Keeling) Islands.



0-9

A
Australia

B
Banknotes of the Cocos (Keeling) Islands
Battle of Cocos

C
Cocos Buff-banded Rail
Cocos Islands Mutiny
Cocos (Keeling) Islands Airport

D

E

F
Fauna of the Cocos (Keeling) Islands
Flora of the Cocos (Keeling) Islands

G

H

I

J

K
Keeling, William

L
List of people on stamps of Australia

M

N
North Keeling

O

P

Q

R

S
SMS Emden (1908)

T
Transport in the Cocos (Keeling) Islands

U

V

W

X

Y

Z

See also
Lists of country-related topics - similar lists for other countries

Cocos (Keeling) Islands
Cocos (Keeling) Islands